"Avec le temps" is a song by French singer-songwriter Isleym. It was released as a digital download on April 1, 2011 as the lead single from her extended play of the same name, and was later included in her debut studio album ''Où ça nous mène.

Music video
The music video for the song was released on 15 November 2010 as part of the EP's release on Isleym's YouTube channel.

Track listing

Chart performance

References

2011 singles
2011 songs
Isleym songs